The equipment of the Royal Brunei Land Forces (RBLF) can be subdivided into: infantry weapons, vehicles, unmanned aerial vehicle (UAVs), and radars. The vehicles operated by the RBLF usually have the identification of the Royal Brunei Armed Forces painted on them.

Vehicles

Ground vehicles

Watercrafts

Firearms

Attires

Historic equipment
  AK-47
 Browning Automatic Rifle
 Colt M16 LMG
 Ferret armoured car
 L1A1 Self-Loading Rifle
 Lee–Enfield bolt-action rifle
 M1911 pistol
 M1919 Browning machine gun
 M3 submachine gun
 MG 3 machine gun
Saxon armoured personnel carrier
 Sterling submachine gun

Future equipment 
There are reports that Brunei is or was interested in Indonesian APCs to replace the VAB APC 

During BRIDEX 2011, the Turkish company FNSS Defence Systems was looking forward in securing a deal with the Brunei government for Armoured combat vehicles (ACV).

Brunei has expressed purchasing between 40 and 50 of the Indonesian/Turkish Harimau/Kaplan medium tank.

Brunei has also shown interest in Russian equipment including:

 Kamov Ka-50 attack helicopters
 Kh-35 BAL-E coastal missile system
 SA-15 Tor missile system
 SA-17 Buk missile system
 T-90 main battle tanks

References

Royal Brunei Land Forces
Brunei